Cara Black and Wayne Black were the defending champions, but lost in semifinals to Lisa Raymond and Mike Bryan.

Lisa Raymond and Mike Bryan won the title, defeating Elena Likhovtseva and Mahesh Bhupathi 6–3, 6–4 in the final. It was the 4th mixed doubles Grand Slam title for Raymond and the 2nd mixed doubles Grand Slam title for Bryan, in their respective careers.

Seeds

Draw

Finals

Top half

Bottom half

External links
 Official results archive (WTA)
2003 French Open – Doubles draws and results at the International Tennis Federation

Mixed Doubles
2003